Lahovice is a cadastral district of Prague, Czech Republic. In 2015, it had 330 inhabitants. There is a confluence of the Berounka and Vltava rivers in Lahovice. There are two settlements in the cadastral district: Lahovice and Lahovičky.

The German name of Lahovice is Lahowitz.

References 

Districts of Prague